= Magdalena Treitschke =

Austrian ballet dancer

Magdalena Treitschke (1788-1816) was an Austrian ballet dancer. She was engaged at the Burgtheater in 1802-1811 and internationally famous in her time.
